Wrestling World 1996 was a professional wrestling event co-produced by the New Japan Pro-Wrestling (NJPW) and UWF International (UWFi) promotions. The event took place on January 4 in the Tokyo Dome. Wrestling World 1996 was the fifth January 4 Tokyo Dome Show held by NJPW. The show drew 54,000 spectators and $5,400,000 in ticket sales. The driving storyline behind the show was an "inter-promotional" rivalry between NJPW and UWFi, which saw wrestlers from the promotions face off in a series of three matches. Hiroshi Hase's retirement match against his former tag team partner Kensuke Sasaki was also part of the card. The main event of the show was IWGP Heavyweight Champion Keiji Mutoh losing the championship to UWFi representative Nobuhiko Takada. The undercard featured an additional title change as Jushin Thunder Liger defeated Koji Kanemoto to win the IWGP Junior Heavyweight Championship. In total the show consisted of 10 matches.

Production

Background
The January 4 Tokyo Dome Show is NJPW's biggest annual event and has been called "the largest professional wrestling show in the world outside of the United States" and the "Japanese equivalent to the Super Bowl".

Storylines
Wrestling World 1996 featured professional wrestling matches that involved different wrestlers from pre-existing scripted feuds and storylines. Wrestlers portrayed villains, heroes, or less distinguishable characters in scripted events that built tension and culminated in a wrestling match or series of matches.

Results

References

External links
NJPW.co.jp 

1996 in professional wrestling
1996 in Tokyo
Wrestling World 1996
January 1996 events in Asia
Professional wrestling joint events